The following tables compare general and technical information for a number of current, notable video hosting services. Please see the individual products' articles for further information.

General information
Basic general information about the hosts: creator/company, license/price etc.

Supported input file formats

Streaming video technical information

Site traffic

Specifically dedicated video hosting websites 

 * Website predominantly hosts live streaming video.

See also 

 Comparison of streaming media software
 Content delivery network
 Streaming television
 Internet Protocol television
 Comparison of music streaming services
 List of streaming media systems
 List of online video platforms
 Multicast
 One-click hosting
 P2PTV
 Protection of Broadcasts and Broadcasting Organizations Treaty
 Push technology
 Streaming media
 Video on demand
 Webcast

References

 
 
Video services